Sarcocheilichthys hainanensis is a species of cyprinid fish found in China, Laos, and Vietnam.

References

Sarcocheilichthys
Taxa named by John Treadwell Nichols
Taxa named by Clifford H. Pope
Fish described in 1927